Out of Range may refer to:

 Out of Range (album), a 1994 album by Ani DiFranco
 Out of Range (film), a 2016 Indian film